Fellowship  of the American Association for the Advancement of Science (FAAAS) is an honor accorded by the American Association for the Advancement of Science (AAAS) to distinguished persons who are members of the Association. Fellows are elected annually by the AAAS Council for "efforts on behalf of the advancement of science or its applications [which] are scientifically or socially distinguished".  

Examples of areas in which nominees may have made significant contributions are research; teaching; technology; services to 
professional societies; administration in academe, industry, and government; and communicating and interpreting science to the public. The association has awarded fellowships since 1874. AAAS publishes annual update of active Fellows list, which also provides email address to verify status of non-active Fellows. See also :Category:Fellows of the American Association for the Advancement of Science for more examples.

AAAS Fellows
AAAS Fellows include Nobel Prize winners 
Michael W. Young and Michael Rosbash, ACM Turing Award winner David Patterson, IEEE Medal of Honor winner Irwin M. Jacobs, and American Physical Society Fellow Natalie Roe. Maria Elena Zavala, who is a recipient of the  Presidential Award for Excellence in Science, Mathematics, and Engineering Mentoring, is also a Fellow. 

Other fellows includes Jiaxing Huang, and Duan Xiangfeng, a materials scientist who received the Beilby Medal and Prize in 2013.

Revocation for harassment 
Starting 15 October 2018, the status of a Fellow can be revoked "in cases of proven scientific misconduct, serious breaches of professional ethics, or when the Fellow in the view of the AAAS otherwise no longer merits the status of Fellow". This is to limit the effects and tolerance of sexual harassment, which Margaret Hamburg, the president of the AAAS said "has no place in science".

This ruling has allowed AAAS to sanction Francisco Ayala, formerly of University of California, Irvine; Thomas Jessell, formerly of Columbia University; Lawrence Krauss, of Arizona State University, Tempe; and Inder Verma, formerly of the Salk Institute for Biological Studies in San Diego, California.

References

 
Science and technology awards
American awards
American Association for the Advancement of Science
American Association for the Advancement of Science